Phrynotettix is a genus of toad lubbers in the family Romaleidae. There are at least three described species in Phrynotettix.

Species
These three species belong to the genus Phrynotettix:
 Phrynotettix robertsi Rehn, J.A.G. & H.J. Grant Jr., 1959
 Phrynotettix robustus (Bruner, 1889) (robust toad lubber)
 Phrynotettix tshivavensis (Haldeman, 1852) (Chihuahua lubber)

References

Further reading

 
 
 
 

Romaleidae